Tertiarius is a genus of freshwater diatoms known from the fossil record.

Species
Some species include:

T. pygmaeus
T. transilvanicus
T. transylvanicus

References

Brachysiraceae
†
Prehistoric SAR supergroup genera